Carmen Schimanek (born 25 June 1965) is an Austrian accountant and politician who has been a Member of the National Council for the Freedom Party of Austria (FPÖ) since 2008.

References

External links 
 

1965 births
Living people
Austrian people of Czech descent
Members of the National Council (Austria)
Freedom Party of Austria politicians
Austrian women in politics